Pleasant Township is one of the ten townships of Clark County, Ohio, United States. The 2010 census reported 3,238 people living in the township, 2,966 of whom lived in the unincorporated portions of the township.

Geography
Located in the northeastern corner of the county, it borders the following townships:
Goshen Township, Champaign County - north
Somerford Township, Madison County - east
Harmony Township - south
Moorefield Township - west
Union Township, Champaign County - northwest

The village of Catawba is located in northern Pleasant Township.

Name and history
It is one of fifteen Pleasant Townships statewide.
Pleasant Township is known for being the home of Zacchary Brown, who was featured in the November 2009 edition of “Time” Magazine for having a uniquely spelled name.

Government
The township is governed by a three-member board of trustees, who are elected in November of odd-numbered years to a four-year term beginning on the following January 1. Two are elected in the year after the presidential election and one is elected in the year before it. There is also an elected township fiscal officer, who serves a four-year term beginning on April 1 of the year after the election, which is held in November of the year before the presidential election. Vacancies in the fiscal officership or on the board of trustees are filled by the remaining trustees.

References

External links
County website

Townships in Clark County, Ohio
Townships in Ohio